The 2009 FedEx Cup Playoffs, the series of four golf tournaments that determined the season champion on the U.S.-based PGA Tour, began on August 27 and ended on September 27. It included the following four events:
The Barclays — Liberty National Golf Club, Jersey City, New Jersey
Deutsche Bank Championship — TPC Boston, Norton, Massachusetts
BMW Championship — Cog Hill Golf & Country Club, Lemont, Illinois
The Tour Championship — East Lake Golf Club, Atlanta, Georgia

For the second time in the three-year history of the playoffs, Tiger Woods won the FedEx Cup.

These were the third FedEx Cup playoffs since their inception in 2007. Substantial changes were made to the point structures, playoff reset of points, and field sizes for 2009.

The point distributions can be seen here.

Regular season rankings

The Barclays
The Barclays was played August 27–30. Of the 125 players eligible to play in the event, only one did not enter—Paul Casey (18), due to a rib injury. Of the 124 entrants, 77 made the second-round cut at +5.

Heath Slocum, who only made the top 125 and the tournament field by two FedEx Cup points, won by sinking a 20-foot (6 m) par putt on the final hole, putting him one shot ahead of a distinguished group consisting of Ernie Els, Pádraig Harrington, Steve Stricker, and Tiger Woods. The top 100 players in the points standings advanced to the Deutsche Bank Championship.

Deutsche Bank Championship
The Deutsche Bank Championship was played September 4–7. Of the 100 players eligible to play in the event, only one did not enter—Paul Casey (27), due to a rib injury. Of the 99 players who entered the tournament, 73 of them made the 36-hole cut at one-under-par. Steve Stricker won by one stroke over Jason Dufner and Scott Verplank and took the lead in the FedEx Cup standings. The top 70 players in the points standings advanced to the BMW Championship.

BMW Championship
The BMW Championship was played September 10–13. Of the 70 players eligible to play in the event, only one did not enter—Paul Casey (36), due to a rib injury. With a field limited to 70, and 69 actually playing, there was no cut. The top 30 players in FedEx Cup points after this event advanced to the Tour Championship and also earned spots in the 2010 Masters, U.S. Open, and (British) Open Championship.

Tiger Woods blew away the field in Saturday's third round with a course-record 62 and cruised from there to win by eight shots over Jim Furyk and Marc Leishman. Woods retook the lead in the FedEx Cup standings going into the Tour Championship. Furyk moved from 18th in the standings to third, putting him into position to claim the FedEx Cup with a win in the Tour Championship. Leishman, who only made the field for the BMW Championship by making an eagle on the final hole of the Deutsche Bank Championship, placed himself in the field for the Tour Championship.

The real drama was for the 30th and final spot in the Tour Championship. Brandt Snedeker was in the final 30 until disaster struck on the final hole. Needing only a bogey to secure his place in Atlanta, and on the green of the par-4 hole in three, he missed his par putt from 12 feet and then had his 3-foot putt for bogey lip out. Snedeker then two-putted from tap-in range. That opened the door for John Senden and Ian Poulter, but both seemingly tried to throw away their shots at a trip to Atlanta. Senden badly chucked his approach shot to the par-5 15th, and hit a bunker shot into the water on 17 for a double-bogey, but Snedeker's mistake allowed him to sneak into the top 30 by 0.46 points over Poulter, who hit his approach on the 18th hole into the water.

With the FedEx Cup points reset after the BMW Championship, all 30 remaining players had at least a mathematical chance to secure the season crown, and any of the top five players could claim the FedEx Cup with a win in the Tour Championship.

Reset points
The points were reset after the BMW Championship.

The Tour Championship
The Tour Championship was played September 24–27, after a one-week break. All 30 golfers who qualified for the tournament played, and there was no cut.

Phil Mickelson claimed his first PGA Tour title since his wife and mother were both diagnosed with breast cancer in spring 2009. This was also his second Tour Championship title, as he won the 2000 edition, also held at East Lake. Mickelson entered the final round four shots behind Kenny Perry, but shot 65 while Perry faded to a 74. Three golfers—top seed Tiger Woods, second seed Steve Stricker, and Mickelson—had a reasonable chance of claiming the FedEx Cup entering the final nine holes, but consecutive birdies by Woods on the 15th and 16th holes secured his second-place finish for the tournament, three shots behind Mickelson. Since Mickelson was not among the top five seeds entering the Tour Championship, this was enough for Woods to secure the FedEx Cup and its $10 million prize.

Final leaderboard

For the full list see here.

Table of qualifying players
Table key:

* First-time Playoffs participant

References

FedEx Cup
FedEx Cup Playoffs